The 25th Guards Motor Rifle Brigade Sevastopol Red Banner named after the Latvian Riflemen is a brigade of the Russian Ground Forces, which traces its history to the 13th Guards Rifle Regiment (:ru:13-й гвардейский стрелковый полк). 

The regiment was established in August 1940 as the 666th Rifle Regiment of the 153rd Rifle Division. From September-November 1941 the division was "ranged among the Guards" by being raised to the status of the 3rd Guards Rifle Division. Then-Lieutenant Colonel Vasily Margelov took over command of the regiment in June 1942. Margelov was to take a leading role in the development of the Soviet Airborne Forces decades after the end of the war.

In February 1944, the division and the 2nd Guards Army was transferred to the area of ​​the Perekop Isthmus and in April-May took part in the Crimean strategic operation. On April 8, the guardsmen of the regiment attacked the Perekop positions. In forty minutes, the regiment overcame four trenches, an anti-tank ditch, five rows of barbed wire and minefields. The enemy did not give up a single high-rise building, not a single line without a fight. To pursue the enemy on April 12, a divisional advanced mobile detachment under the command of Captain V. Stebunov [2], who later became the regiment commander, set out. The detachment swiftly pursued the enemy, cutting off his escape routes, and defeated eight rearguard barriers. During the operation on April 13, 1944, Evpatoria was liberated and, in cooperation with other troops of the 4th Ukrainian Front and the Black Sea Fleet, Sevastopol was liberated on May 9.

At some later point the regiment was given the title "Sevastopol" for its role in seizing the city.

The 13th Guards Rifle Regiment continued serving with the 3rd Guards Rifle Division after the end of the war. Almost all such formations were reorganized into the new "Motor Rifle" organisation in June 1957, and thus the now-13th Guards Motor Rifle Regiment formed part of the new 3rd Guards Motor Rifle Division as it had the old. The division was stationed at Klaipeda in the Lithuanian SSR, Baltic Military District. 

From May 1956 the 13th Guards Motor Rifle Regiment was stationed in Adazi (Adazi-2, now Kadaga) near the town of Riga in the Latvian Soviet Socialist Republic. The regiment trained and prepared junior officers and specialists: BMP commander, gunner guns of drivers of various military vehicles, radio chiefs, commanders of the engineering units.

In March 1963 the 13th Guards Motor Rifle Regiment was transferred to the 24th Tank Training Division. The 24th Tank Training Division on 14 September 1987 became the 54th District Training Centre. 

In accordance with the Directive of the First Deputy Chief of the Joint Armed Forces of the Commonwealth of Independent States on 11 March 1992 No. 314/3/0327, and the Directive of the Commander of the North Western Group of Forces on 29 August 1992 No. 6/1/0287, 13th Guards Red Banner Sevastopol Training Motor Rifle Regiment was reorganised as the 25th Guards Motor Rifle Brigade, seemingly in September 1992.

In accordance with a directive of the Defence Minister of the Russian Federation on 11 October 1993 No. 314/1/001200, Directive General Staff of the Armed Forces of the Russian Federation on 11 November 1993 No. 453/4/01002-25 25th Guards Motor Rifle Sevastopol Red Banner separate brigade named after the Latvian Riflemen was relocated from Latvia to Strugi Krasnye (Vladimirsky Lager), Pskov Oblast, Russia, becoming part of the troops of the Leningrad Military District.

Meanwhile still back in Latvia the 54th District Training Centre was disbanded in 1995.

Warfare.ru reported that the brigade, based at Vladimirsky Lager, was a redesignation of the 42nd Base for Storage of Weapons and Equipment. In 2000 it had 443 personnel, 31 T-80; 24 Uragan, 236 MT-LBT. In 2009: BM-21 Grad – 18, 152mm 2S3M Akatsia – 36, 2B14 Podnos– 18, 100 mm MT-12 Rapira – 6, 9P149 Shturm-S – 18, 9A33BM2(3) Osa – 12, 9A34(35) Strela-10 – 6, 2S6M Tunguska – 6. 41(82) T-80, 120 MT-LB. 4393?(2200?) personnel. The brigade was involved in several mobilisation exercises over the years. 

The brigade entered Ukraine as the 2022 Russian invasion of Ukraine commenced. However due to irreparable battle losses in the Kharkiv Oblast during the Northeastern Ukraine offensive, units of the brigade left the combat zone on March 8, 2022, and returned to Nekhoteyevka of Belgorod Oblast to begin to attempt to implement measures to restore combat capability.

See also 
Latvian Riflemen Soviet Divisions

References 

Valdis V Pavlovskis, Russian Withdrawals from Latvia – An Update, Jane's Intelligence Review, Volume 5, Issue 4, April 1993, p 166.

Mechanised infantry brigades of Russia
Military units and formations established in 1992